Samuel Taylor Coleridge (1772–1834) was an English poet, literary critic, philosopher and theologian.

Coleridge may also refer to:

Places 
 Coleridge, an electoral ward of Cambridge, England
 Coleridge, Nebraska, U.S.
 Coleridge, North Carolina, U.S.
 Lake Coleridge, Canterbury, New Zealand
 Coleridge Hundred, an ancient subdivision of Devon, England
 Coleridge (New Zealand electorate), a former parliamentary electorate
 Coleridge (crater), a crater on planet Mercury
 Coldridge, Devon, England

Other uses 
 Coleridge (surname), a list of people with the surname Coleridge
 Baron Coleridge of Ottery St Mary in the County of Devon, a title in the Peerage of the United Kingdom
 Coleridge Community College, Cambridge, England
 SS Empire Coleridge, a tanker ship

See also 
 
Coleridge-Taylor (disambiguation)